The Attmore–Oliver House is a building on the National Register of Historic Places in New Bern, North Carolina. It is on 511 Broad Street and in the New Bern National Historic District. It was originally built in 1790 and enlarged around 1834. The house is white and features three stories and a large porch in both the front and the back.

The house is owned by the New Bern Historical Society and is used for Society functions.  It no longer operates as a house museum.  Limited displays are open for self-guided tours by appointment.

The house is also supposedly one of the most haunted houses in New Bern.

Resources
 The Attmore–Oliver House brochure

References

External links
New Bern Historical Society

Houses on the National Register of Historic Places in North Carolina
Houses completed in 1790
Museums in Craven County, North Carolina
Historic house museums in North Carolina
Reportedly haunted locations in North Carolina
Houses in New Bern, North Carolina
National Register of Historic Places in Craven County, North Carolina
1790 establishments in North Carolina